Carcharomodus is an extinct genus of lamnid shark. Its only species is currently C. escheri.

References 

Prehistoric shark genera
Monotypic fish genera
Lamnidae